The Shoulder of Mutton was a public House in Hadleigh, Suffolk, England. It originally occupied 124 and 126 Hadleigh High Street.

The building dates back to the sixteenth century, but it became a pub by 1796. The Sporting Magazine reported a wager over a run to the Fox.

The buildings were first listed in 1950. At that time it was a Tolly Cobbold pub, and a  Tolly Cobbold agreement concerning the pub dates from 1961. However, by 1968 the premises were used as an antique shop.

References

Grade II* listed pubs in Suffolk
Hadleigh, Suffolk